Eleanor Davies may refer to:

 Eleanor Davies (poet) (1590–1652), writer and prophet
 Eleanor Trehawke Davies (1880–1915), English aviator